Clarence Clinton Coe (January 4, 1864 – April 29, 1936) was a member of the Wisconsin State Assembly.

Biography
Coe was born on January 4, 1864 in Sterling, Illinois. In 1884, he graduated from high school in Sterling, Illinois and moved to Barron (town), Wisconsin. Later, Coe graduated from the University of Wisconsin Law School in 1888. That year, he married Claudia Mae Smith. His cousin, Jerome, was a municipal judge and his brother, Arthur, was a school board member. Coe and his family were members of the Methodist Episcopal Church. He died on April 29, 1936.

Career
Coe was elected to the Assembly in 1918 and was defeated for re-election in 1920. Previously, he had been District Attorney of Barron County, Wisconsin from 1889 to 1891 and a municipal judge from 1892 to 1900. He was appointed municipal judge again in 1928. He was a Republican.

References

External links

People from Sterling, Illinois
People from Barron, Wisconsin
Members of the Wisconsin State Assembly
District attorneys in Wisconsin
Municipal judges in the United States
Methodists from Wisconsin
20th-century Methodists
University of Wisconsin Law School alumni
1864 births
Burials in Wisconsin
1936 deaths